Janine Cossy (born in 1950) is a French chemist who specialises in the synthesis of biologically-active products and is an emeritus professor of organic chemistry at ESPCI Paris.

Biography
Janine Cossy earned a doctorate in chemistry at the University of Reims, and then undertook a post-doctoral fellowship with the team of  Professor Barry Trost at the University of Wisconsin at Madison. Appointed as a professor at ESPCI ParisTech in 1990, her work focuses on the total synthesis of natural biologically-active products like anticancer agents, antibiotics, anti-inflammatories or products acting on the central nervous system. She has also conducted research on free-radical reactions and photochemical reactions.  
Janine Cossy has been a consultant for Rhône-Poulenc, Rhodia and L'Oréal and co-founded the startup Acanthe Biotech and CDP Innovation.

Distinctions
 Elected President of the Organic Chemistry Division of the French Chemical Society from 2002 to 2006 and of the Franco-Japanese Chemical Society
 Awarded the Jungfleish Prize by the Academy of Sciences in 1996
 Awarded the CNRS Silver Medal in 1996
 Admitted as a Knight to the National Order of Merit in 1997
 Awarded several pharmaceutical company prizes:  Novartis in 2000 and 2008, the Boehringer Ingelheim in 2001, Eli Lilly and Company in 2008, Abbott Laboratories in 2008, and both AstraZeneca and Bristol-Myers-Squibb in 2010.
 Admitted as a Knight to the Legion of Honour in 2013

She edits the scientific journals Organic Letters, New Journal of Chemistry, European Journal of Organic Chemistry and the Journal of Organic Chemistry.

Works
 Carbon with No Attached Heteroatoms (Elsevier Science, 2005)
 Comprehensive organic functional group transformations (Elsevier Science, 2005)

References

External links 
Profile at ESPCI (English)

1950 births
Living people
Scientists from Reims
20th-century French chemists
21st-century French chemists
French women chemists
Chevaliers of the Légion d'honneur
21st-century French women scientists